Doris Esmid Patiño Marín (born May 1, 1986, in Sogamoso, Boyacá) is a Colombian taekwondo practitioner. She won a silver medal for the 57 kg class at the 2011 Pan American Games in Guadalajara, Mexico, losing out to Mexico's Irma Contreras. She later followed that up with a bronze medal four years later at the 2015 Pan American Games in Toronto, Canada.

Patino qualified for the women's 57 kg class at the 2008 Summer Olympics in Beijing, after placing third from the Pan American Qualification Tournament in Cali, Colombia. She lost the first preliminary round match to Italy's Veronica Calabrese, who was able to score two points at the end of the game.

References

External links

NBC Olympics Profile

Colombian female taekwondo practitioners
1986 births
Living people
Olympic taekwondo practitioners of Colombia
Taekwondo practitioners at the 2008 Summer Olympics
Taekwondo practitioners at the 2016 Summer Olympics
Taekwondo practitioners at the 2011 Pan American Games
Sportspeople from Boyacá Department
Pan American Games silver medalists for Colombia
Pan American Games medalists in taekwondo
Taekwondo practitioners at the 2015 Pan American Games
Pan American Games bronze medalists for Colombia
Medalists at the 2011 Pan American Games
Medalists at the 2015 Pan American Games
21st-century Colombian women